Diego Oscar Nicolaievsky (born 20 April 1993) is an Argentine professional footballer who plays for Hapoel Kfar Shalem, as a winger.

Career
Nicolaievsky signed for Gimnasia La Plata in 2012, and turned professional in 2014. He made his professional debut later that season. In December 2015, Nicolaievsky conducted negotiations to join Israeli club Hapoel Kiryat Shmona as his Jewish background would have qualified him for Israeli citizenship.

He moved on loan to Club Almagro in January 2016.

On 7 September 2016 signed to Maccabi Herzliya.

Personal life
Nicolaievsky is Jewish.

References

1993 births
Living people
Jewish Argentine sportspeople
Jewish footballers
Argentine footballers
Club de Gimnasia y Esgrima La Plata footballers
Club Almagro players
Maccabi Herzliya F.C. players
Gimnasia y Esgrima de Jujuy footballers
Hapoel Bnei Lod F.C. players
Hapoel Marmorek F.C. players
Hapoel Acre F.C. players
Hapoel Kfar Shalem F.C. players
Argentine Primera División players
Primera B Metropolitana players
Liga Leumit players
Association football wingers
Argentine emigrants to Israel